James Crawford (1816 – November 22, 1878) was an Ontario businessman and political figure. He represented Brockville in the 1st Canadian Parliament as a Conservative member.

He was born in County Cavan, Ireland in 1816, the oldest son of George Crawford, and came to Upper Canada with his family during the 1820s. Crawford served in Cornwall, Ontario during the Upper Canada Rebellion and was a member of the Incorporated Militia of Upper Canada for several years. He served as lieutenant-colonel in the local militia from 1866 to 1871. Crawford was a contractor involved in the construction of several canals on the Saint Lawrence River.

Crawford married a Miss Harris. He died in Brockville at the age of 62.

His brother John served as Lieutenant-Governor of Ontario.

Electoral record

References 

1816 births
1878 deaths
Conservative Party of Canada (1867–1942) MPs
Members of the House of Commons of Canada from Ontario
Irish emigrants to pre-Confederation Ontario
Immigrants to Upper Canada